Oreumenes is a small Far East genus of large Eumenes-like potter wasps.

References

 Yamane, S. 1990. A revision of the Japanese Eumenidae (Hymenoptera, Vespoidea). Insecta Matsumurana (n.s.) 43 : 1–189. 

Biological pest control wasps
Potter wasps
Hymenoptera genera